Kacheliba is a settlement in Kenya's Rift Valley Province  within West Pokot County. It was the original colonial (British) capital of this county, but due to the heat and malaria, the capital was moved upland to the south to Kapenguria, where it remained.

References 

Populated places in West Pokot County